Cetyl alcohol , also known as hexadecan-1-ol and palmityl alcohol, is a C-16 fatty alcohol with the formula CH3(CH2)15OH. At room temperature, cetyl alcohol takes the form of a waxy white solid or flakes.

Preparation
Cetyl alcohol was discovered in 1817 by the French chemist Michel Chevreul when he heated spermaceti, a waxy substance obtained from sperm whale oil, with caustic potash (potassium hydroxide). Flakes of cetyl alcohol were left behind on cooling. Modern production is based around the chemical reduction of ethyl palmitate.

Uses 
Cetyl alcohol is used in the cosmetic industry as an opacifier in shampoos, or as an emollient, emulsifier or thickening agent in the manufacture of skin creams and lotions. It is also employed as a lubricant for nuts and bolts, and is the active ingredient in some "liquid pool covers" (forming a non-volatile surface layer to reduce water evaporation, related latent vaporization heat loss, and thus to retain heat in the pool). Moreover, it can also be used as a non-ionic co-surfactant in emulsion applications.

Side effects 
People who suffer from eczema can be sensitive to cetyl alcohol, though this may be due to impurities rather than cetyl alcohol itself.  However, cetyl alcohol is sometimes included in medications used for the treatment of eczema.

Related compounds 
 Palmitate
 Palmitic acid

References 

Fatty alcohols
Antioxidants
Non-ionic surfactants
Lubricants
Cosmetics chemicals
Whale products
Primary alcohols
Alkanols
Semiochemicals
Insect pheromones